Spirembolus synopticus is a species of sheet weaver found in the United States. It was described by Crosby in 1925.

References

Linyphiidae
Spiders of the United States
Spiders described in 1925